The Grand Free Trade Area (GFTA) is a project envisaged by several regional blocs in Africa (Southern African Development Community, East African Community and the Common Market for East and Southern Africa) in order to bring about increased intra-African trade. 

The idea behind joining these economies is to enable Africa to become far more self-reliant. It will also allow small economies to have access to larger regional markets; bringing about diversity, GDP growth and increased employment.

The initial stages would be to increase road, rail and communications infrastructure in order to facilitate intra-continental trade and allow for an increased sharing of ideas and skills.

Successes and progress
Various road, bridges and border post projects are currently in progress. The Kenya-Tanzania highway project (dual lane) is starting in mid-2013 and with the funding of the African Development Bank should be completed by the end of 2016. The Entebbe-Kampala highway should also be completed by the end of 2016, increasing the transport network in Uganda. The Kenyan port of Mombasa is also undergoing a revamp with a new container terminal and new road and rail links to serve its increasing load.

The North-South Corridor is a project within the GFTA. It plans to link Cape Town and Cairo with tarred roads and increased infrastructure. Road projects between Dar es Salaam and Cairo are underway and the section will be fully tarred by 2015. Single stop border posts are also being planned for most border posts along the route.

References

International development in Africa
Trade blocs
Free trade agreements
Economic integration
Free-trade areas